Jasmin Hutter (b. 11 June 1978 in Altstätten) is a Swiss politician of the Swiss People's Party, of which she is vice-president.

She holds an MP position at the National Council of Switzerland as a representative from Saint-Gall, and is a member of the Political Institutions commission.

Notes and references 
  Website

1978 births
Living people
People from Altstätten
Members of the National Council (Switzerland)
Swiss People's Party politicians
Women members of the National Council (Switzerland)
21st-century Swiss women politicians
21st-century Swiss politicians